Telephone numbers in Paraguay all have the same format since 2002, consisting of the country code (595), followed by a phone number.

Phone numbers in Paraguay have 9 digits. The first two or three digits are the area code, the remaining six or seven digits are the subscriber number.

According to ITU document for Paraguay found in here: https://www.itu.int/oth/T0202.aspx?lang=en&parent=T0202, the national number format for the basic telephony service may have 2 variations:

Where A is NOT equal to 0, 1, 8 and 9; and B, X and Y is NOT equal to 0.

To make local calls inside Paraguay, the 6- or 7-digit subscriber number is used.

To make a call to cell phone, dial "0" + the number of cell phone.

To make inter-provincial calls, it is required to dial prefix "0" followed by (P)QR code + the 9-digit phone number.

(P)QR is the code for long-distance basic service providers which have the following format: (P)[2-7][1-8]. Presently(?), digit "P" is reserved. Thus, only 2 digits "QR" are used presently.

To make an international call, it is required to dial prefix "00" followed by (P)QR code + the international number.

Numbers starting with the digit "1" are used for special services like Ambulance - 128.

List of area codes in Paraguay

Telephone line

Mobile phones

The generic format for mobile numbers is:

Where X is NOT equal to 0 and 1.

External links
  Information on the 2002 number plan
  COPACO S.A. – Codes section

Paraguay
Communications in Paraguay
Telephone numbers